Bay 13 is a section of tiered seating at the Melbourne Cricket Ground that occupies part of the Shane Warne Stand behind the slips for a right-handed batsman, usually where third man is fielding. It was well known in the cricket world as a centre for rowdy spectators to congregate at the cricket and participate in practices such as Mexican waves, beach ball throwing and other disorderly conduct, often including abuse chanting towards opposition players.

History 
Historically, Bay 13 is unofficially seen as an important part of the MCG's atmosphere and environment. Iconic pictures are regularly repeated in cricket coverage of the crowd mimicking Merv Hughes' warm up stretches in front of the Bay 13 mob.

Through the 1970s, 1980s, 1990s and 2000s, Bay 13 was an Australian cultural icon. Along with the SCG's Hill, Bay 13 became an internationally recognised symbol of vocal and fanatic support for the Australian cricket team. Bay 13 enjoyed a mixed reputation, beloved by Australian players for their unwavering support, but branded the "worst cricket fans in the world" by the ICC and other overseas cricket boards.

The removal of General Admission seating on the lower level for all international cricket games at the MCG in 2008 impacted the character of Bay 13. Patrons could no longer spontaneously join their friends in the Bay 13 hijinks as in past years. Coupled with a security crackdown, this has caused not only hooliganism but also the famous MCG atmosphere to decline at international cricket matches in Melbourne. In 2019 the Bay 13 area was replaced with a "Boundary Social" area with higher-priced tickets, a dress code and a private bar.

Criticism 
Bay 13 is situated almost opposite across the ground from the members stand and despite efforts to tame the behaviour of the crowd from this section of the ground, it had the worst behaved crowds of all the cricketing venues in the country.

It was commonplace for spectators in Bay 13 to abuse - and even throw objects at - opposition players fielding in front of them.

In January 1999, Shane Warne was forced to come out of the change rooms and don a helmet in an attempt to calm the crowd who had disrupted a one-day match by throwing bottles onto the pitch. A string of incidents involving projectiles being thrown at opposition fielders during one-day internationals in the late 1990s and early 2000s prompted authorities to beef up security presence around the Bay 13 area, which led to a reduction in Bay 13 hooliganism in subsequent years.

At the 2005 Boxing Day test, reports of people throwing cups of urine and other liquids into the air during Mexican waves were downplayed by patrons of Bay 13.

Racism
In more recent times, Bay 13 has often been accused of racially abusing opposition teams, fans and players. The first such instance occurred on Boxing Day, 2005, when Bay 13 directed racial taunts in Afrikaans at South African fast bowler André Nel. The South African Cricket Board has repeatedly raised concerns over racial taunting of players by Bay 13. South Africa ceased playing Test cricket at the MCG after 2008. Fans were ejected from the 2018 Boxing Day test for taunting Indian players and spectators.

References

Sports venues in Melbourne
Cricket grounds in Australia